Corex may refer to:

 Corex, a cough medicine
 Corex Process, a metal smelter configuration
 Corex (geological analysis), a defunct provider of analysis services to the petroleum industry
 Corex, in Greek mythology, one of the sons of Coronus
 Corex, a steel-making plant owned by Mittal Steel South Africa
 Corex D filter, a product of Taeyeong I&T
 A common misspelling of the corrugated plastic material Correx used in signmaking